Shine Group of Institutions is a college located in Irba, Ranchi, Jharkhand, India. It has a large campus of 30 acres and more than 130 teachers.

Academics
The school offers instruction in Nursing, Pharmacy, Paramedical, and Education.

References

Schools in Ranchi
Educational institutions established in 2009
2009 establishments in India